Venkata Raju or Venkataraju is an Indian name.

 Kolanka Venkata Raju, famous Mridangam artist.
 Manthena Venkata Raju, was an Indian politician and social worker.
 M. Venkataraju, an Indian film music director.
 Thotakura Venkata Raju, better known as T. V. Raju, an Indian film music director.